Sambhaji Pawar (1941 – 15 March 2021) was a member of the Sangli Assembly constituency of Maharashtra and is a member of the Bharatiya Janata Party.

Positions held
 1986: Elected Bypoll to Maharashtra Legislative Assembly - Janata Dal
 1990: Elected to Maharashtra Legislative Assembly - Janata Dal 
 1995: Elected to Maharashtra Legislative Assembly - Janata Dal 
 2009: Elected to Maharashtra Legislative Assembly - Bharatiya Janata Party

References

1941 births
2021 deaths
Maharashtra MLAs 1985–1990
Bharatiya Janata Party politicians from Maharashtra
People from Sangli
Maharashtra MLAs 1990–1995
Maharashtra MLAs 1999–2004
Maharashtra MLAs 2004–2009